The Sound of Music is a 70-minute studio album of Richard Rodgers's and Oscar Hammerstein's 1959 musical, starring Frederica von Stade, Håkan Hagegård and Eileen Farrell, performed with the Cincinnati Pops Orchestra under the direction of Erich Kunzel. It was released in 1988.

Background
The album presents a version of the score of the musical not previously recorded, including the numbers "I have confidence in me" and "Something good" that Rodgers composed for Robert Wise's 1965 The Sound of Music film, as well as the number "An ordinary couple" that Wise discarded. The "Nature music" that opens the album is a première recording.

Recording
The album was digitally recorded on 13–14 December 1987 in Cincinnati Music Hall.

Cover art
The LP, cassette and CD issues of the album all use the same cover, designed by Liggett-Stashower under the art direction of Ray Kirschensteiner. The photograph of Alpine scenery on the front of the album was taken by Ric Ergenbright. The photograph of von Stade and the album's child performers on the back of the cover was taken by David Katzell.

Critical reception

Adrian Edwards reviewed the album on CD in Gramophone in December 1988. The last musical that Rodgers and Hammerstein had created together was greatly beloved, he wrote, but it had never before been made available on disc in a version as all-encompassing as Erich Kunzel's. As well as presenting the musical's theatrical score in its entirety, Kunzel's album included the additional numbers that Rodgers had composed for Robert Wise's much garlanded 1965 movie. (Rodgers wrote his new numbers' lyrics as well as their music, Hammerstein having died in 1960.)

The first of these, "I have confidence in me", was sung by Julie Andrews in the sequence following Maria's journey from her nunnery to her new home in the von Trapp family's villa. The second, "Something good", was a duet for Andrews to sing with Christopher Plummer's Baron instead of a number that Wise had rejected,  "An ordinary couple". Edwards had previously thought the latter rather "commonplace", and he had been surprised to find that it was one of the tracks on Kunzel's disc that he most enjoyed. It had been improved by the addition of "a charming little verse never before recorded", and further enhanced by "the mellow duetting of [Frederica] von Stade and Håkan Hagegård", "with the strings of the Cincinnati Pops providing a lovely velvet-like sheen as a backdrop". Hagegård was good, too, in a "prettily" sung "Edelweiss".

As the Mother Abbess, Eileen Farrell was strong and assured in "Climb ev'ry mountain", "that solo that's an open invitation to sing flat", making it seem all the stranger that she had been denied her rightful place duetting with Maria in "My favorite things". The children cast as the young von Trapps sang cheerfully, and Telarc's engineering was of audiophile grade - the entry of the church organ in "Processional" was "designed to raise the roof". The album's only weakness lay in the contribution made to it by its leading lady. Von Stade was fine in some of her music, "but when high spirits and some enthusiasm are required, this Maria sounds just world-weary."

Roy Hemming reviewed the album on CD in Stereo Review in January 1989. It demonstrated, he wrote, that it was possible to "breathe fresh life into the score of a major Broadway musical" by entrusting it to a judiciously chosen crossover cast, a US symphony orchestra and a top-class conductor. Erich Kunzel had presented collectors with the most complete edition of The Sound of Music that had ever appeared on the shelves of a record shop. HIs CD included every note of Richard Rodgers's stage score, even including some interludes that had been omitted from the original cast recording, as well as the extra music that Rodgers had composed for Julie Andrews's movie.
 
The singer in Andrews's shoes was Frederica von Stade, "a wonderfully warm and vocally glowing Maria" who seemed entirely at home in her sabbatical from opera (except when she was called upon to yodel in "The lonely goatherd"). The veteran Eileen Farrell was "genuinely thrilling" in "Climb ev'ry mountain", sounding in better voice than she had done for many years. Håkan Hagegård and Barbara Daniels were both excellent too. Erich Kunzel conducted "with the right mixture of bounce, bite and romantic sentimentality." Telarc's engineers had created a variety of acoustics appropriate to the musical's different environments. The organ in the wedding scene and the finale would "blow your socks off". All in all, the disc was an impressive recording of a radiant performance.

The album was also discussed in Fanfare, Opera, Michael Patrick Kennedy and John Muir's Collins guide to musicals and Michael Portaniere and Jerry Herman's The Theatermania Guide to Musical Theater Recordings.

CD track listing
Richard Rodgers (1902-1979)

The Sound of Music, lyrics by Oscar Hammerstein II (1895-1960), book by Howard Lindsay (1889-1968) and Russel Crouse (1893-1966), suggested by The Story of the Trapp Family Singers by Maria Augusta Trapp (1905-1987)

 1.1 (1:02) Nature music, Orchestra
 1.2 (1:38) "The sound of music", Maria
 2 (0:14) The Abbey bells
 3 (1:00) "Mono chant", Sister Bertha, Chorus of nuns
 4 (0:57) "Morning hymn", Chorus of nuns
 5 (0:08) "Angelus bells", Chorus of nuns
 6 (0:46) "Alleluia", Chorus of nuns
 7 (3:03) "Maria", Mother Abbess, Sister Bertha, Sister Sophia, Sister Margaretta
 8 (2:27) "My favorite things", Maria
 9 (3:25) "I have confidence in me", Maria
10 (5:29) "Do-re-mi", Maria, Children
11 (4:42) "Sixteen going on seventeen", Rolf, Liesl
12 (3:02) "The lonely goatherd", Maria, Children
13 (2:46) "How can love survive", Max, Elsa
14 (3:19) Reprise: "The sound of music", Maria, Georg, Children
15.1 (0:59) The party scene, Orchestra
15.2 (0:25) Grand waltz, Orchestra
15.3 (0:33) Ländler, Orchestra
16 (2:48) "So long, farewell", Children
17 (3:22) "Climb ev'ry mountain", Mother Abbess
18 (2:55) "No way to stop it", Elsa, Max, Georg
19 (4:10) "An ordinary couple", Maria, Georg
20 (3:00) "Something good", Maria, Georg
21.1 (1:11) "Processional", Organ, Chorus
21.2 (1:47) "Confitemini Domino", Chorus of nuns
21.3 (0:41) "Alleluia", Chorus of nuns
22 (2:05) Reprise: "Sixteen going on seventeen", Maria, Liesl
23 (1:18) Reprise: "Do-re-mi", Maria, Georg, Children
24 (2:25) "Edelweiss", Georg
25 (1:52) Reprise: "So long, farewell", Maria, Georg, Children
26 (1:45) Reprise: "Climb ev'ry mountain", Mother Abbess, Chorus

Personnel

Musical
 Frederica von Stade, Maria
 Håkan Hagegård, Captain Baron Georg von Trapp
 Eileen Farrell (1920-2002), Mother Abbess
 Barbara Daniels, Elsa Schraeder
 Lewis Dahle von Schlanbusch, Max Detweiler
 Neil Jones, Rolf Gruber
 Kimberley Barber, Sister Sophia
 Sandra Graham, Sister Margaretta
 Janet Stubbs, Sister Bertha
 The Children:
 Jeanne Menke, Liesl
 Devon Biere, Friedrich
 Michelle Kear, Louisa
 Vincent Lee, Kurt
 Heather McFadden, Brigitta
 Heather Harpenau, Marta
 Lauren Frederick, Gretl
 May Festival Chorus
 John Leman, chorus director
 Robert Muckenfuss, organ
 Paul Patterson, guitar
 Cincinnati Pops Orchestra
 Erich Kunzel (1935-2009), conductor

Other
 Robert Woods, producer
 Jack Renner, engineer
 Michael Bishop, technical assistant
 Thomas Knab, technical assistant and editor
 Rosalind Ilett, editor
 Elaine Martone, editor

Release history
In 1988, Telarc released the album on LP (catalogue number DG-10162), cassette (catalogue number CS-30162) and CD (catalogue number CD-80162). The CD was accompanied by a 20-page insert booklet offering biographies of the principal artists and a detailed history and synopsis of the musical by Allen Cohen, all in English only.

References

1988 albums
Cast recordings
Classical crossover albums
The Sound of Music
Telarc Records albums